The Roman Catholic Archdiocese of Kisangani is the Metropolitan See for the Ecclesiastical province of Kisangani in the Democratic Republic of the Congo.

History
 August 3, 1904: Established as the Apostolic Prefecture of Stanley Falls from the Apostolic Vicariate of Léopoldville
 March 10, 1908: Promoted as the Apostolic Vicariate of Stanley Falls 
 March 10, 1949: Renamed as the Apostolic Vicariate of Stanley-ville
 November 10, 1959: Promoted as the Metropolitan Archdiocese of Stanley-ville
 May 30, 1966: Renamed as the Metropolitan Archdiocese of Kisangani

Special churches
The seat of the archbishop is the Cathédrale Notre-Dame du Rosaire in Kisangani.

Bishops

Ordinaries, in reverse chronological order
 Metropolitan Archbishops of Kisangani (Roman rite), below
 Archbishop Marcel Utembi Tapa (since 28 November 2008)
 Archbishop Laurent Monsengwo Pasinya (1 September 1988 – 6 December 2007); promoted to Metropolitan Archbishop of the Roman Catholic Archdiocese of Kinshasa and Primate of the DRC; named Cardinal in 2010
 Archbishop Augustin Fataki Alueke (26 September 1967 - 1 September 1988)
 Archbishop Nicolas Kinsch, S.C.I. (10 November 1959 - 26 September 1967); see below
 Vicars Apostolic of Stanley-ville (Roman rite), below
 Bishop Nicolas Kinsch, S.C.I. (7 May 1958 – 10 November 1959); see above
 Bishop Camille Verfaillie, S.C.I. (1 February 1934 – 1958)
 Vicar Apostolic of Stanley Falls (Roman rite), below
 Bishop Émile-Gabriel Grison, S.C.I. (12 March 1908 - 28 March 1933); see below
 Prefect Apostolic of Stanley Falls (Roman rite), below
 Father Émile-Gabriel Grison, S.C.I. (3 August 1904 - 12 March 1908); see above

Auxiliary bishops
Alphonse-Marie Runiga Musanganya (1979-1980), appointed Bishop of Mahagi-Nioka
Laurent Monsengwo Pasinya (1981-1988), appointed Archbishop here; future Cardinal

Suffragan dioceses
 Bondo
 Bunia
 Buta
 Doruma–Dungu
 Isangi
 Isiro–Niangara
 Mahagi–Nioka
 Wamba

See also
Roman Catholicism in the Democratic Republic of the Congo

Sources

 GCatholic.org

Kisangani
Roman Catholic dioceses in the Democratic Republic of the Congo
Christian organizations established in 1904
Roman Catholic dioceses and prelatures established in the 20th century
1904 establishments in the Congo Free State
A